Madhav R. Bir (Madhav Ramkrishna Bir)  was a Goa liberation activist and a politician from Goa. He was a member of Goa Legislative Assembly from Panaji. Bir was married to Mitra Bir.

References

Goa MLAs 1977–1980
People from Panaji
Janata Dal politicians
Janata Party politicians
Maharashtrawadi Gomantak Party politicians
Year of birth missing
Year of death missing